Lily & Kat is a 2015 American coming-of-age comedy-drama film, written and directed by Micael Preysler.

After its premiere at the TIFF Next Wave, Mance Media released the film theatrically and on video on demand on March 20, 2015 in the United States.

Plot
Set in New York City, the film follows a naive fashion school graduate named Lily who finds her world turned upside down when her reckless best friend Kat announces she’s moving away to London in a matter of days. At a Lower East Side art gallery opening the next night, they meet the enigmatic rising artist Henri, who Lily quickly takes a liking to. With less than seven days left together and a new guy coming between them, Lily and Kat will find their “unbreakable” friendship put to the test.

Cast
Jessica Rothe as Lily
Hannah Murray as Kat
Jack Falahee as Henri
David Wilson Barnes as Ben
Mimi Gianopulos as Agatha
Scott Evans as Nick

References

External links
 
 

2015 films
2010s coming-of-age comedy-drama films
2015 romantic comedy-drama films
2010s female buddy films
American independent films
American coming-of-age comedy-drama films
Films set in New York City
Films shot in New York City
2015 directorial debut films
2015 comedy films
2015 drama films
2015 independent films
2010s English-language films
2010s American films